Trevor Livingston Harvey (born 25 September 1980) is a Bahamian professional basketball player. He is 2.11 meters tall (6-feet-9 1/2) and weighs 109 kilograms (240 pounds). Has good anticipation for blocked shots without fouling. Has always had good rebounds-per-minutes-played numbers, but never played starter's minutes at Florida State.

College career

Freshman (1999-00)
As a freshman at Marshalltown CC, averaged 2.5 blocked shots while shooting 0.603 from the field.

Sophomore (2000-01)
As a sophomore at Marshalltown CC, averaged 13.0 points, 6.5 rebounds, and 3.0 blocked shots while shooting a team-high 0.571 from the field. Ranked fifth in the conference in scoring, fourth in rebounds, and fifth in field goal percentage. Led team with 16 points in a win against Iowa Western. Registered a team-high 14 points in a near-upset of Moberly JC.

Junior (2001-02)
Tied for 10th in the ACC in blocked shots (0.9 rpg). Registered at least one blocked shots in 20 games. Scored season-high 10 points on 5-for-6 shooting and grabbed four rebounds against Western Carolina. Tallied seven points, seven rebounds, and three blocked shots at Georgia Tech. Scored seven points and pulled down nine rebounds in season-high 22 minutes in the ACC Tournament against Clemson.

Senior (2002-03)
Averaged 8.4 points, 5.1 rebounds and 1.2 blocked shots in 18.4 minutes a contest. Led team in field goal percentage and blocked shots. Led the team in scoring in three games, and paced the team in rebounding in seven contests. Recorded only career double-double with career-highs in points (19) and rebounds (10) against Maryland. Scored 17 points on perfect 7-for-7 shooting, grabbed seven rebounds, and blocked three shots against Stetson. Tallied 15 points and three blocked shots against Wake Forest in the ACC Tournament.

College career highlights
Played final two seasons of collegiate career at Florida State Seminoles after starting career at Marshalltown Community College in Iowa (complete stats unavailable). Ranks sixth in FSU history in career field goal percentage (0.576) and 12th in blocked shots (60). Earned all-tourney honors at the 2003 Portsmouth Invitational Tournament after averaging 14.7 points, 6.7 rebounds and 3.67 blocked shots.

External links
Profile at nba.com
Profile at eurobasket.com
Profile at RealGM.com
tblstat.net

1980 births
Living people
Algodoneros de la Comarca players
Bahamian men's basketball players
Bahamian expatriate basketball people in Bulgaria
Bahamian expatriate basketball people in France
Bahamian expatriate basketball people in Hungary
Bahamian expatriate basketball people in Mexico
Bahamian expatriate basketball people in Morocco
Bahamian expatriate basketball people in Romania
Bahamian expatriate basketball people in Sweden
Bahamian expatriate basketball people in Turkey
Bahamian expatriate basketball people in the United States
Centers (basketball)
Élan Chalon players
Fenerbahçe men's basketball players
Florida State Seminoles men's basketball players
Marshalltown Tigers men's basketball players
People from Eleuthera
People from Inagua
Power forwards (basketball)